The following is a list of Miss International titleholders from the competition's inaugural edition in 1960 to present.

Miss International titleholders
† = deceased

Notes:

Countries by number of wins

Continents by number of wins

Resigned wins

Winners gallery

See also
 List of Miss International runners-up and finalists
 List of Miss Earth titleholders
 List of Miss Universe titleholders
 List of Miss World titleholders
 Big Four international beauty pageants

References
General

Specific

External links
Past titleholders at Miss International official website

Miss International
Miss International titleholders
Miss International titleholders